The Om is a river in the south of the Western Siberian plains in Russia. It is a right tributary of the Irtysh. It rises in the Vasyugan Swamp at the border of Novosibirsk and Tomsk oblasts. The name is probably from the word om "quiet" in the language of the Baraba Tatars. The city of Omsk is situated at the confluence of Om and Irtysh. The main tributaries are the Icha, Kama and Tartas.

References 

Rivers of Novosibirsk Oblast
Rivers of Omsk Oblast